Southwest Art is a magazine published by Peak Media Properties that specializes in fine art depicting art of the American Southwest.

History and profile
Southwest Art was first published in May 1971. Initially, the magazine was based in Houston, Texas. It first dealt with arts in Houston and then its coverage expanded to the broader southwestern United States. The magazine mainly features paintings and textiles, but also digital and other modern creative endeavors. It mostly covers articles about the artists, galleries, and collectors. Sister publications include The Collector’s Guide focusing on the art and galleries of New Mexico.

References

External links
Southwest Art home page

1971 establishments in Texas
Visual arts magazines published in the United States
Monthly magazines published in the United States
Magazines established in 1971
Magazines published in Texas
Southwestern United States
Magazines published in Colorado
Mass media in Houston